Physics of Fluids is a monthly peer-reviewed scientific journal covering fluid dynamics, established by the American Institute of Physics in 1958, and is published by AIP Publishing. The journal focus is the dynamics of gases, liquids, and complex or multiphase fluids—and the journal contains original research resulting from theoretical, computational, and experimental studies.

History
From 1958 through 1988, the journal included plasma physics. From 1989 until 1993, the journal split into Physics of Fluids A covering fluid dynamics, and Physics of Fluids B, on plasma physics. In 1994, the latter was renamed Physics of Plasmas, and the former continued under its original name, Physics of Fluids.

The journal was originally published by the American Institute of Physics in cooperation with the American Physical Society's Division of Fluid Dynamics. In 2016, the American Institute of Physics became the sole publisher. From 1985–2015, Physics of Fluids published the Gallery of Fluid Motion, containing award-winning photographs, images, and visual streaming media of fluid flow.

With funding from the American Institute of Physics the annual "François Naftali Frenkiel Award" was established by the American Physical Society in 1984 to reward a young scientist who published a paper containing significant contributions to fluid dynamics during the previous year. The award-winning paper was chosen from Physics of Fluids until 2016, but is presently chosen from Physical Review Fluids. Similarly, the invited papers from plenary talks at the annual American Physical Society Division of Fluid Dynamics were formerly published in Physics of Fluids but, since 2016, are now published in either this journal or Physical Review Fluids.

Reception
Physics of Fluids A, Physics of Fluids B, and Physics of Fluids were ranked 3, 4, and 6, respectively based on their citation impact from 1981–2004 within the category of journals on the physics of fluids and plasmas. According to the Journal Citation Reports, the journal has a 2021 impact factor of 4.980.

Editors-in-chief
The following persons are or have been editors-in-chief:
 1958–1981: François Naftali Frenkiel
 1982–1997: Andreas Acrivos
 1998–2015: John Kim, L. Gary Leal
 2016–present: Alan Jeffrey Giacomin

Further reading

See also
 List of fluid mechanics journals

References

External links
 
 Physics of Fluids Gallery of fluid motion

Fluid dynamics journals
Publications established in 1958
Monthly journals
English-language journals
American Institute of Physics academic journals